Peru participated at the 2010 Summer Youth Olympics in Singapore.

The Peruvian squad consisted of 26 athletes competing in 10 sports: aquatics (swimming), athletics, badminton, judo, sailing, taekwondo, tennis, volleyball, weightlifting and wrestling.

Medalists

Athletics

Girls
Track and Road Events

Badminton

Boys

Girls

Judo

Individual

Team

Sailing

Windsurfing

Swimming

Taekwondo

Tennis

Singles

Doubles

Volleyball

Weightlifting

Wrestling

Freestyle

References

External links
Peruvian Olympic Committee

2010 in Peruvian sport
Nations at the 2010 Summer Youth Olympics
Peru at the Youth Olympics